Marta Baeza Centurion (born March 2, 1992 in Rio de Janeiro, Brazil) is a Brazilian fencer who participated in the women's sabre fencing event at the 2016 Summer Olympics.

2016 Summer Olympics 
In the 2016 Summer Olympics, Marta went down with an injury when she played against Bogna Jozwiak.

2022 Fencing Peace Caravan 

In response to the 2022 Russian invasion of Ukraine, Marta co-organised the Fencing Peace Caravan, a project to take 21 underage Ukrainian fencers between the ages of 9 and 17 to Madrid, allowing them to study, train, and have a routine as close as possible to what they had before the war.

References 

1992 births
Living people
Brazilian female sabre fencers
Olympic fencers of Brazil
Fencers at the 2016 Summer Olympics
Fencers at the 2015 Pan American Games
Sportspeople from Rio de Janeiro (city)
21st-century Brazilian women